Richard Edward Hoffman (born June 12, 1970) is an American actor widely known for playing Jerry Best in The Bernie Mac Show (2002–2005), Chase Chapman in Samantha Who? (2007–2009) and Louis Litt in the legal drama series Suits (2011–2019).

Early life
Hoffman was born in New York City to Charles and Gail Hoffman. He grew up in Roslyn Heights, New York with his brother Jeff Hoffman. He was raised Jewish. He graduated from The Wheatley School in Old Westbury, New York before attending the University of Arizona. After graduating, he moved to Los Angeles, California to start a medical career.

Career
Hoffman was cast in his first role, as a security guard in Conspiracy Theory, in 1997. He had some other small roles until he received a main role as Freddie Sacker on Darren Star's short-lived Wall Street series The $treet in 2000, which was pulled from the airwaves after seven episodes, but which allowed him to quit his job waiting tables and move back to New York. His subsequent TV roles included Terry Loomis on the short-lived Steven Bochco law drama Philly in 2001–2002, Jerry Best in The Bernie Mac Show (2002–2005), Patrick Van Dorn on the John Stamos comedy Jake in Progress (2004–2005) and Chase Chapman on the ABC comedy Samantha Who? (2007–2009). In 2011, he landed a starring role as Louis Litt in the USA Network series Suits, which ran until 2019. 
His other TV and film work includes The Day After Tomorrow, Blood Work, Hostel, Cellular and The Condemned. He has also appeared as a guest in CSI: Miami, Chuck, The Pretender, Law & Order: SVU, NCIS, Crossing Jordan, Without a Trace, The Practice, CSI:NY, CSI: Crime Scene Investigation, Shark, Lie to Me, Andy Richter Controls the Universe, Monk, Billions, and The Mentalist.

Filmography

Film

Television

References

External links 

1970 births
Male actors from New York City
American male film actors
American male television actors
Jewish American male actors
Living people
University of Arizona alumni
20th-century American male actors
21st-century American male actors
People from Old Westbury, New York
People from Roslyn Heights, New York
The Wheatley School alumni
21st-century American Jews